Ng Yi Sheng (born 1980) is a Singaporean gay writer.  He has published a collection of his poems entitled last boy, which won the Singapore Literature Prize, and a documentary book on gay, lesbian and bisexual Singaporeans called SQ21: Singapore Queers in the 21st Century in 2006.

Early life and education
Ng lived in Hong Kong with his parents for three years during his childhood. On his return to Singapore, he attended the Anglo-Chinese School.  He graduated from Columbia University, USA, where he majored in Comparative Literature and Writing. His writing teachers at Columbia University included Louise Rose, Steve Austin, Paul Violi and Timothy Donnelly. He completed an MA in creative writing at the University of East Anglia in 2014.

Through the initiative of the Creative Arts Programme, he underwent mentorship schemes with the poets Lee Tzu Pheng and Angeline Yap, as well as worked on playwriting under Theatreworks' Greenhouse Project and The Necessary Stage's Playwright's Cove.

Publications
His poems have been published in the poetry anthologies First Words, onewinged, No Other City and Love Gathers All, as well as the journals the2ndRule, Quarterly Literary Review Singapore, Softblow, Quarto, Asian Journal and Queer. In 1998, he won first prize in the NUS Poetry Competition, and in 2003, fared similarly at the Writers' Week Poetry slam.

His performed plays include Serve (The Ordinary Theatre), Snake (Stage Right), Redhill Blues (Creative Arts Alumni Programme, Republic Polytechnic), Hungry (Theatreworks, Singapore Polytechnic, Anderson Secondary School and International Islamic University, Malaysia). One of his plays formed the core of Poetic Licence, a performance poetry production by STAGES presented in 2002 and 2005.

In August 2006, he published a collection of gay, lesbian and bisexual Singaporeans' coming out stories, SQ21: Singapore Queers in the 21st Century. In October 2006, he published his first collection of poetry, Last Boy, which won the Singapore Literature Prize.

In 2007, Ng completed his work on 251, a play about the life of Singaporean porn star Annabel Chong and Georgette, a musical about the artist Georgette Chen.

Performances
Ng performed slam poetry pieces for ContraDiction, Singapore's first gay poetry reading event held in 2005, and was a co-organiser and performer in its sequel, ContraDiction 2, in 2006.

He delivered a lecture on Western gay history during IndigNation 2006, Singapore's second gay pride season.

Bibliography
Poetry
Last Boy (Firstfruits Publications, 2006) 
Loud Poems For A Very Obliging Audience (Math Paper Press, 2016) 
A Book of Hims (Math Paper Press, 2017) 

Prose
SQ21: Singapore Queers in the 21st Century (Oogachaga Counseling and Support, 2006) 
Eating Air (Firstfruits Publications, 2006) 
On His Wings: Soaring (2008) 
Lion City (Epigram, 2018) 

Plays
251 (2007)
Georgette (2007)
The Last Temptation of Stamford Raffles (2008)

Edited Anthologies
First Words: A Selection of Works by Young Writers in Singapore (Unipress, 1996) 
Onewinged: An Anthology of Young Writing (Unipress, 2001) 
Roots and Wings: A Selection of Works by Writers from the Creative Arts Programme (Gifted Education Branch, Ministry of Education, 2009) 
GASPP: A Gay Anthology of Singapore Poetry & Prose (Ethos Books, 2010) 
Eastern Heathens: An Anthology of Subverted Asian Folklore (Ethos Books, 2013) 
HEAT: A Southeast Asian Urban Anthology (Buku Fixi, 2016) 

Translations
The New Village by Wong Yoon Wah (with Ho Lian Geok) (Ethos Books, 2012)

External links
 Ng Yi-Sheng's careerblog

References

1980 births
Living people
Anglo-Chinese School alumni
Columbia University alumni
Alumni of the University of East Anglia
Singaporean people of Chinese descent
Singaporean LGBT writers
Singaporean poets
Gay writers
Singapore Literature Prize winners
Male poets
LGBT poets